The Adams–Fairview Bonanza Farm near Wahpeton, North Dakota, is a bonanza farm that was developed in 1905.  It was listed on the National Register of Historic Places in 1990.

References

Farms on the National Register of Historic Places in North Dakota
1905 establishments in North Dakota
Bonanza farms
National Register of Historic Places in Richland County, North Dakota
American Craftsman architecture in North Dakota